Avas or Avantas (Greek, modern: Άβαντας, katharevousa: Άβας, Bulgarian: Дервент, Turkish: Dervent) is a village in the southern part of the Evros regional unit, Greece.  Avantas is located 10 km north of Alexandroupoli.  It is on the Greek National Road 53 (Alexandroupoli - Mikro Dereio - Ormenio), between Alexandroupoli to the south and Aisymi to the north.  In 2011 its population was 527.

Population

History

The village was founded by the Ottoman Turks. Its inhabitants were 3/4 Bulgarian and 1/4 Turkish before the Balkan Wars and the Greco-Turkish War (1919-1922). According to professor Lyubomir Miletich, the 1912 population contained 320  Bulgarian families.  Refugees from east of the Evros river and from Asia Minor arrived into the village. Its name was changed from the Turkish Dervent to the current Avas.

People

Mitro Karabeljata, Revolutionary leader and strategist of Tane Nikolov

See also

List of settlements in the Evros regional unit

References

External links
Avas or Avantas on GTP Travel Pages

Alexandroupolis
Populated places in Evros (regional unit)